Lord Peter is a collection of short stories featuring Lord Peter Wimsey.
First published in 1972, it includes all the short stories about Lord Peter written by Dorothy L. Sayers, most of which were published elsewhere soon after they were written, and some related writings.

Contents
Introduction, by James Sandoe
 Twelve stories which constituted Lord Peter Views the Body (1928)
"The Abominable History of the Man with Copper Fingers"
"The Entertaining Episode of the Article in Question"
"The Fascinating Problem of Uncle Meleager's Will"
"The Fantastic Horror of the Cat in the Bag"
"The Unprincipled Affair of the Practical Joker"
"The Undignified Melodrama of the Bone of Contention"
"The Vindictive Story of the Footsteps That Ran"
"The Bibulous Business of a Matter of Taste"
"The Learned Adventure of the Dragon's Head"
"The Piscatorial Farce of the Stolen Stomach"
"The Unsolved Puzzle of the Man with No Face"
"The Adventurous Exploit of the Cave of Ali Baba"
 Four stories from Hangman's Holiday (1933)
"The Image in the Mirror"
"The Incredible Elopement of Lord Peter Wimsey"
"The Queen's Square"
"The Necklace of Pearls"
 Two stories from In the Teeth of the Evidence (1939)
"In the Teeth of the Evidence"
"Absolutely Elsewhere"
 Three later stories also collected in Striding Folly (1972)
"Striding Folly"
"The Haunted Policeman"
"Talboys"
Coda: "Sayers, Lord Peter and God", by Carolyn Heilbrun
Codetta: "Greedy Night, A Parody", by E. C. Bentley

Sources
Sayers, Dorothy L. Lord Peter: A Collection of All the Lord Peter Wimsey Stories. New York: Harper & Row, 1972.

1972 short story collections
Short story collections by Dorothy L. Sayers
Harper & Row books